The short barbelled catfish (Nemapteryx augusta) is a species of catfish in the family Ariidae. It was described by Tyson R. Roberts in 1978, originally under the genus Arius. It inhabits the Fly River in Papua New Guinea. Its diet consists of bony fish in the families Chanidae, Clupeidae and Melanotaeniidae.

References

Ariidae
Fish described in 1978